The following is a 'list of people from Longueuil, Quebec.

A
 John Aird, banker

B
 Micheline Beauchemin, textile artist and weaver
 Yves Beauchemin, novelist
 Jean Béliveau, former Montreal Canadiens center (1950–71); member of the Hockey Hall of Fame
 Marco Berthelot, curler
 Daniel Berthiaume, former ice hockey goaltender
 Marilou Bourdon, singer
 Rosario Bourdon, cellist, violinist, conductor, arranger and composer
 Max Boyer, professional wrestler
 Daniel Brabant, former baseball player
 Richard Brodeur, former National Hockey League goaltender, known as 'King Richard' with the Vancouver Canucks (1980–87)

C
 Elisha Cuthbert, actor; played Kim Bauer on 24; grew up in Greenfield Park
 Steven Crowder, conservative political commentator on YouTube; grew up in Greenfield Park

D
 André Dallaire
 Pierre Deniger, politician

G
 Céline Galipeau, news presenter
 Garry Galley, former NHL player
 Bruno Gervais, professional ice hockey defenceman
 Claude Gladu, mayor
 Steve Green, professional baseball player

H
 Benoit Huot, swimmer

J
 Marlene Jennings, politician

K
 Anthony Kavanagh, actor

L
 Guy Laliberté, Cirque du Soleil founder and Chief Executive Officer
 Irina Lazareanu, model
 Patrick Leduc, soccer player

M
Anthony Mantha, NHL player of the Detroit Red Wings
 Marie-Victorin, Christian brother and botanist
 Pauline Marois, former Taillon MNA
 Julie Masse, singer
 Torrey Mitchell, NHL player
 Isabelle Morneau, soccer player

N
 Craig Norman, basketball coach

O
 Nils Oliveto, actor, screenwriter
 Jacques Olivier, former mayor

P
 François Paré, author
 Kevin Parent, singer/songwriter
 André Pratte, journalist and economist
 Raymond Préfontaine, politician

R
 Stéphane Roy, electroacoustic music composer

S
 Caroline St-Hilaire, politician
 Myriane Samson, figure skater
 Julie Snyder, TV host

T
 Maxime Talbot, Pittsburgh Penguins hockey player
 Jack Todd, Montreal Gazette'' columnist

 
Longueuil
Longueuil